Altansükhiin Erdenebayar (born 13 January 1981) is a Mongolian international footballer. He made his first appearance for the Mongolia national football team in 2011.

References

1981 births
Mongolian footballers
Mongolia international footballers
Living people
Association football midfielders
Mongolian National Premier League players